Edgar Brasil (1902–1954) was a German-born Brazilian cinematographer. He worked on more than 50 productions during his career.

Selected filmography
 Limite (1931)
 Hello, Hello, Carnival! (1936)
 Minas Conspiracy (1948)

References

Bibliography 
 Shaw, Lisa & Dennison, Stephanie. Brazilian National Cinema. Routledge, 2014.

External links 
 

1902 births
1954 deaths
German cinematographers
German male film actors
Brazilian cinematographers
Brazilian male film actors
Male actors from Hamburg
20th-century German male actors
Film people from Hamburg
German emigrants to Brazil